BAA or Baa may refer to:

Letters and sounds
 Baa, onomatopoeic representation of the noise made by sheep
Bāʾ, the Arabic letter ب
 Baa, the fifth consonant of the Thaana script used in the Dhivehi language

Places
 Baa Atoll, an administrative division of the Maldives
 Ba'a, the capital of the Indonesian island of Roti
 BAA Ground, a now defunct cricket venue in Rangoon, Burma
Bialla Airport, Papua New Guinea (IATA code BAA)

Organisations
 BAA plc, a former British airport operator, now called Heathrow Airport Holdings
 BAA USA, the American subsidy of BAA plc.
 Basketball Association of America, the former name of the National Basketball Association
 Billiard Association of America, former name of the Billiard Congress of America
 Birmingham Architectural Association, a professional association of architects based in Birmingham, England
British Astronomical Association, a national association of amateur astronomers in the UK
 Boston Athletic Association, sports association for the city of Boston, hosts such events as the Boston Marathon
 Broadway Across America, a theatre company

Other uses
 Batting average against, a statistic in baseball that measures a pitcher's ability to prevent hits
 Bachelor of Applied Arts, a degree
 Backing Australia's Ability, an innovation plan
 Broad Agency Announcement, a technique for United States government agencies to contract for basic and applied research and certain development
 Kwah language, also known as Baa, a Niger-Congo language

See also

Ba (disambiguation)
B2A (disambiguation)
BA2 (disambiguation)